The chapters of the Japanese seinen manga series Oh My Goddess! were written and illustrated by Kōsuke Fujishima and serialized in the monthly manga anthology Afternoon. The series, premiered in the September 1988 issue; 308 chapters in total have been serialized. The series followed the daily life of college student Keiichi Morisato, after his wish for a goddess to stay with him forever is granted by Belldandy and her two sisters.

The individual chapters are collected and published in tankōbon volumes by Kodansha. The first volume was released on August 23, 1989; Forty-one volumes have been released. The series has been adapted into a five-episode original video animation (OVA) series released between February 1993 and May 1994; a 48-episode anime television series titled The Adventures of Mini-Goddess that featured super deformed versions of the characters; and a feature film released in 2000. In 2005, the manga was adapted into a second, 48-episode anime television series by Anime International Company that aired in Japan from January 2005 through September 2006. The series has also been adapted into a novel titled Oh My Goddess!: First End by Yumi Tōma, the voice of Urd, which was released by Kodansha on July 20, 2006; it was licensed in English by Dark Horse Comics and released on December 12, 2007.

Oh My Goddess! is licensed for an English-language release in North America by Dark Horse. The company initially published the first 112 chapters individually, with the first chapter released on August 1, 1994, and chapter 112 on September 1, 2004, until volume 19/20, after which they only published the collected volumes. They also serialized individual chapters in their defunct manga anthology, Super Manga Blast!. The first three volumes have had three different releases; they were initially published in a single abridged volume titled "1-555-GODDESS" on November 1, 1996, and were later re-released in unabridged volumes between June 5 and October 7, 2002. The first 129 chapters were redistributed between volumes 1 through 20 so that each volume better followed story arcs; after this reordering, the English release had 19 volumes. The fourth volume was released on October 15, 1997; volume 19, which Dark Horse numbered "19/20" and which ended on the same chapter as the Japanese volume 20, was released on January 19, 2005. After this release, they began republishing the first 20 volumes, this time following the Japanese chapter layout and using a new translation; they also continued publishing volumes from 21 on, these also followed the original Japanese chapter layout. The third re-release of volume 1 was on December 7, 2005, and the re-release was concluded with volume 20, which was released on February 22, 2012. Volume 21 was published by Dark Horse on July 6, 2005, and volume 41 was released on April 25, 2012. Editor Carl Gustav Horn noted Dark Horse's accelerated printing schedule of "new volumes every four months": when Dark Horse released volume 21 they were nine volumes behind Japan; at volume 41, they were only at four volumes behind; and that the English volume 44 was released five months after the Japanese release of volume 45, so he considered the publication caught up.

Volume listing

Volumes 1–20

Volumes 21–40

Volumes 41–48

References

External links
 
 

Chapters
Oh My Goddess!